Patrick Evan Montini (15 June 1929 – 26 August 2008) was a South African rugby union player.

Playing career
Montini attended the Hoërskool Jan van Riebeeck in Cape Town, where his centre partner in the school's first team was another future Springbok, Daantjie Rossouw. In 1949, after leaving school he played for Gardens Rugby Club in Cape Town and made his provincial debut for Western Province in 1951. In 1953 Montini moved to Worcester and played provincial rugby for Boland and in 1955, he relocated to Stellenbosch to study law at Stellenbosch University and was again selected to represent Western Province.

Montini made his test debut for the Springboks in the first test match against Australia during the 1956 Springbok tour of Australia and New Zealand, on 26 May 1956 at the SCG. Montini played two test matches and nine tour matches for South Africa. He did not score any points in tests, but scored one try and one drop goal in the tour matches.

Test history

See also
List of South Africa national rugby union players – Springbok no. 328

References

1929 births
2008 deaths
South African rugby union players
South Africa international rugby union players
Western Province (rugby union) players
Alumni of Hoërskool Jan van Riebeeck
Boland Cavaliers players
Rugby union players from Cape Town
Rugby union centres